Cryptosophia is a genus of parasitic flies in the family Tachinidae. There is one described species in Cryptosophia, S. aurulenta.

Distribution
Brazil.

References

Diptera of South America
Dexiinae
Tachinidae genera
Monotypic Brachycera genera